Dysprosium phosphide is an inorganic compound of dysprosium and phosphorus with the chemical formula DyP.

Synthesis
The compound can be obtained by the reaction of phosphorus and dysprosium at high temperature.
4 Dy + P4 → 4 DyP

Physical properties
DyP has a NaCl structure (a=5.653 Å), where dysprosium is +3 valence. Its band gap is 1.15 eV, and the Hall mobility (μH) is 8.5 cm3/V·s.

DyP forms crystals of a cubic system, space group Fm3m.

Uses
The compound is a semiconductor used in high power, high frequency applications and in laser diodes.

References

Phosphides
Dysprosium compounds
Semiconductors
Rock salt crystal structure